Yasmany Tomás Bacallao (born November 14, 1990) is a Cuban professional baseball outfielder who is a free agent. He played for the Cuba national baseball team at the 2013 World Baseball Classic.  He played for the Industriales in the Cuban National Series League from 2008 through 2013. He has played in Major League Baseball (MLB) for the Arizona Diamondbacks.

Professional career

Cuban beginnings
Tomás began his professional career in his home country, Cuba, where he played for the Industriales de La Habana in the Cuban National Series League. His first professional year of baseball was in 2008 where he played 35 games batting .297 with a home run, four stolen bases, and 11 RBI. In 2009, Tomás played 22 games batting .192 with a home run and three RBIs. After no participation in 2010, Tomás gained playing time in 2011 where he played 69 games batting .301 with 16 home runs, four stolen bases, and 42 RBI. In 2012, Tomás played 81 games batting .289 with 18 home runs, three triples, and 60 RBI. In 2013, he played 65 games batting .290 with six home runs, six stolen bases, and 35 RBI. In 2014, Tomás left Cuba in an effort to play in Major League Baseball.

Arizona Diamondbacks

On November 26, 2014, Tomás agreed to a six-year, $68.5 million contract with the Arizona Diamondbacks. The deal became official on December 8.

On April 4, 2015, Tomás was optioned to the Triple-A Reno Aces to begin the year. He was called up to the majors on April 15 and made his MLB debut that day, grounding out in his lone at-bat. Tomás made his first start at third base on April 22 when Jake Lamb was placed on the 15-day DL.  He recorded his first RBI on April 28. On May 17, 2015, Tomás hit his first career home run off of Phillies reliever Ken Giles. Tomás finished 2015 by playing in 118 games with a .273 average, 9 home runs, and 48 RBIs.

In 2016, Tomás played in 140 games, having a .272 batting average, 30 doubles, 31 home runs, and 83 RBIs.

On August 21, 2017, it was announced that Tomás would undergo core surgery, ending his 2017 season.

On March 25, 2018, Tomás was optioned to Triple-A Reno, where he spent the entire year.

On April 2, 2019, Tomás cleared waivers and was outrighted from the Diamondbacks 40-man roster, remaining with the Triple-A Reno Aces. On May 20, 2019, while in Triple-A, Tomás hit four home runs in a single game as the Aces beat the Tacoma Rainiers 25-8. On July 26, the Diamondbacks selected Tomás' contract. On August 4, Tomás was outrighted to Reno.

On October 28, 2020, he was one of 147 players declared free agents following the conclusion of the 2020 Major League Baseball season.

Washington Nationals
On November 17, 2020, Tomás signed a minor league contract with the Washington Nationals organization. On March 27, 2021, Tomas was released by the Nationals. On March 29, Tomas re-signed with the Nationals on a new minor league contract. Tomás was released following the 2021 season.

Personal life
In January 2018, Tomás was arrested for criminal speeding when he was allegedly driving  on Arizona State Route 101.

See also

List of baseball players who defected from Cuba

References

External links

1990 births
Living people
2013 World Baseball Classic players
Defecting Cuban baseball players
Estrellas Orientales players
Cuban expatriate baseball players in the Dominican Republic
Major League Baseball outfielders
Major League Baseball players from Cuba
Cuban expatriate baseball players in the United States
Arizona Diamondbacks players
Industriales de La Habana players
Reno Aces players
Rochester Red Wings players
Baseball players from Havana
Cuban expatriate baseball players in Mexico
Cañeros de Los Mochis players